Juan Bautista Planelles Marco (born 26 January 1951 in Burriana, Valencian Community) is a Spanish retired footballer who played as a midfielder.

Honours
Real Madrid
Copa del Generalísimo: 1969–70, 1973–74
UEFA Cup Winners' Cup: Runner-up 1970–71

Castellón
Segunda División: 1980–81
Copa del Rey: Runner-up 1972–73

References

External links

CiberChe biography and stats 

 

1951 births
Living people
People from Burriana
Sportspeople from the Province of Castellón
Spanish footballers
Footballers from the Valencian Community
Association football midfielders
La Liga players
Segunda División players
Real Madrid CF players
CD Castellón footballers
Valencia CF players
Real Zaragoza players
Spain youth international footballers
Spain amateur international footballers
Spain international footballers